

Sanya Bay is one of the five major bays in Sanya City, Hainan Province, China. Located at the southern coast of Hainan, directly south of Sanya city, it has a 22 km beach. It is bordered by a peninsula at the east side. Within the bay are two islands called Xidao and Dongdao. The artificial resort Phoenix Island is located in the bay near the eastern end of the beach.

In recent years, as the waters of Sanya Bay and others below mentioned are becoming clearer and healthier, several species of dolphins including endangered Chinese white dolphins appear along the coasts from time to time, they have not been considered as targeted tourism attractions.

Panoramic image

See also
Yalong Bay

Notes

External links
 Sanya Bay, Xinhuanet.

Bays of Hainan
Beaches of China
Sanya